Anna October (born 31 December 1991) is a Ukrainian fashion designer who works in Paris, France. In 2014, she was a finalist for the LVMH Prize.

Early life 
October was born in Zaporizhzhia, Ukraine. Her ancestors took the surname October after the October Revolution of 1917. Her mother was a lieutenant colonel in the police department. October learned the craft of sewing and fashion design at the Zaporizhzhia College of Technology and Design and at an art school in Odessa.

Career 
October founded her label in Odessa in 2010. Ukraine's antiquated customs system made growth outside of the European Union difficult for Ukrainian fashion designers; therefore, she works in Paris. Customs prevented her ability to import new fabrics. She began reusing her own stock and aspires to be a sustainable brand. October's brand is known for its slip dresses and knitwear.

Russo-Ukrainian war and business restructuring 
On 24 February when the Russian military attacked Kyiv with bombardment, October was forced to flee her home in the middle of the night with few items and rescue documents and money from her business, although she had to leave her stock behind. She made the journey to Bucharest, Romania, having spent a day at a remote house in the forest, and then flew to Paris. Her employees have moved operations to Estonia and Western Ukraine. On account of her employees sending the pieces over, October was able to show her collection during Paris Fashion Week. October is donating 30% of her sales to UNICEF and has partnered with Julie Pelipas, a former editor for Vogue Ukraine, to support Ukrainian fashion designers.

References 

1991 births
Living people
Ukrainian fashion designers
Ukrainian women fashion designers
Ukrainian refugees
Businesspeople from Kyiv
Businesspeople from Zaporizhzhia
Ukrainian women in business
Ukrainian expatriates in France